Dégradé is a 2015 Palestinian drama film directed by Arab and Tarzan Nasser (also known as Mohammed Abunasser and Ahmed Abunasser). It was selected to compete in the International Critics' Week section at the 2015 Cannes Film Festival.

Cast
 Hiam Abbas
 Sameera Asir as Fatima
 Victoria Balitska as Christeen
 Raya Khatib as Ruba
 Raneem Daoud as Mariam
 Manal Awad
 Dina Shuhaiber
 Maisa Abdelhadi
 Huda Al Imam
 Widad Al Nasser baa 
 Mirna Sakhleh

See also
 List of Palestinian films

References

External links
 

2015 films
2015 drama films
Palestinian drama films
2010s Arabic-language films